Punjab State Highway 11, commonly referred to as SH 11, is a state highway in the state of Punjab in India. This state highway runs through Ludhiana district and Sangrur district from Ludhiana to Sangrur in the state of Punjab. The total length of the highway is 75 kilometres.

Route description
The route of the highway is Ludhiana-Sarinh-Dehlon-Nanakpur Jaghera-Kup Kalan-Malerkotla-Dhuri-Sangrur.

Major junctions

  National Highway 7 in Sangrur
 Major District Road 90 (MDR 90) in Dehlon

See also
List of state highways in Punjab, India

References 

State Highways in Punjab, India